The New York Times Spelling Bee, or simply the Spelling Bee, is a word game distributed in print and electronic format by The New York Times. Created by Frank Longo, the game debuted in a weekly print format in 2014, with a digital daily version with an altered scoring system launching on May 9, 2018.

Gameplay

The game presents players with a grid of 7 letters arrayed in a honeycomb structure. The player scores points by using the letters to form words consisting of four or more letters. However, any words proposed by the player must include the letter at the center of the honeycomb. Each letter can be used more than once. Scoring points leads to progressively higher praise for the player's effort, such as "Solid", "Amazing", and "Genius". Each puzzle is guaranteed to have at least one pangram, which awards the player the largest number of points when found. If the player finds all of the possible words in a given puzzle, they achieve the title of "Queen Bee".

Creation
Spelling Bee was created by Frank Longo following a proposal from Will Shortz, who was inspired by the puzzle game Polygon from The Times. The game launched in its print format in 2014 as a weekly feature in The New York Times Magazine. The game's digital version debuted on May 9, 2018. The cartoon bee mascot, Beeatrice, was designed by Robert Vinluan for the digital version. As of August 2021, the game is maintained by Sam Ezersky, who is responsible for constructing the daily puzzle, which goes live at 3 A.M. Eastern Time every day.

Reception
Since its online debut in 2018, Spelling Bee's popularity has grown and the game has received praise from other game makers in the media industry. Pat Myers of The Washington Post wrote that, despite being a lifelong promoter of The Washington Post, she found herself in "the thrall of the New York Times Spelling Bee game". Nilanjana Roy of the Financial Times praised the game as one of the best ways to pass the time and connect with friends during the COVID-19 pandemic lockdowns. Jim Memmot of the Rochester Democrat and Chronicle similarly praised the game as a pleasant pastime during the COVID-19 pandemic.

In addition to its reception among critics, the game has also spawned a significant following on social media, with players posting their scores and discussing each day's word selections on Twitter. Several online tools have been created to provide daily hints and analysis of the puzzle, among them one by science fiction author William Shunn.

Influence
The same concept was adapted to the Catalan language by a non-profit in November 2021. The website, called , went viral in Catalonia a month after its launch.
The game has also been translated to other languages, being www.palabreto.com the official Spanish version.

References

External links
 Spelling Bee
	

2018 video games
Browser games
The New York Times
Video games developed in the United States
Word games
Word puzzle video games